Accra Hearts of Oak Sporting Club, commonly referred to as Hearts of Oak or just Hearts, is a professional sports club based in Accra (Greater Accra), Ghana. Founded in 1911, the club is the oldest surviving football club in Ghana and its traditional colours are red, yellow and blue. Hearts of Oak competes in the Ghana Premier League, the premier division on the Ghanaian football pyramid. The Accra Sports Stadium is the club's home grounds, where it plays its home games.  

Hearts has won the Premier League twenty-one times, the Ghanaian FA Cup a record twelve times, the Ghana Super Cup, a joint record three times the President's Cup, six times, and the CAF Champions League and the CAF Confederations Cup once each. Accra Hearts of Oak was also ranked eighth football club in the world in the year 2000 when the club dominated most of the continent's sporting activities. Accra Hearts of Oak remains the only football club in West Africa to have won a Continental Treble; one of 6 Africa-based clubs and one of 21 football clubs worldwide to have achieved this feat. During the colonial period, Hearts of Oak won a combined total of eight football league trophies in the Accra Football League and the Gold Coast Club Competition, both precursors to the Ghana Premier League. In the Accra Football League, Hearts of Oak won the Guggisberg Shield donated by Sir Gordon Guggisberg, then Governor of the Gold Coast in 1922; the competition for Accra-based clubs was played on 12 occasions between 1922 and 1954; Hearts of Oak won the Shield six times, including the final tournament played in 1954.

History
The club was founded on 11 November 1911 in Accra. Hearts of Oak won their first major match in 1922 when Sir Gordon Guggisberg, then Governor of the Gold Coast, founded the Accra Football League. Hearts won 6 out of 12 seasons in this league. The club also won the 1953/54 edition of the Gold Coast Club Competition - the colonial precursor to the Ghana Premier League. In 1956, Hearts joined the Ghanaian Football League and have flourished ever since.

In the year 2000, the Hearts of Oak won the Ghanaian FA cup, the Ghana Premier League and for the first time in their history the CAF Champions League. This was the most successful year in the club's history. The team was led by club Joseph Ansah.

On 9 May 2001, 127 people died in Africa's worst footballing disaster. During a match between rivals, Hearts of Oak and Asante Kotoko. Trouble started when supporters of Asante Kotoko began ripping out seats in an act of hooliganism in protest at a goal allowed by the referee. The match was officiated by referee J. Wilson Sey, from Cape Coast. Police reacted by firing tear gas into the crowd, it has been suggested that this was an over-reaction. Reports suggest that the gates to the ground were locked and the stadium was not up to FIFA standards. The rush to escape the tear gas was a contributory factor to the death toll. A commission inquiry, indicted six police officers in its initial report, but they were not convicted as it was deemed that the deaths could have been caused by the stampede instead of the tear gas. As of 2020, the transfer value of the Accra Hearts of Oak was £2.03 million, the highest of all sports clubs in Ghana.

Grounds

Accra Hearts of Oak play home matches at the Accra Sports Stadium. The Accra Sports Stadium holds an estimated 40,000 seats. Although purchased in the 1980s, the Pobiman Training Ground was only put to use in the summer of 2018. Construction for an expansion of the 19-acre site in the Pobiman neighborhood, is currently in the planning stages way. The club plans to build a state-of-the-art facility.

Rivalries
Accra Hearts of Oak's longest established rivalry is with Asante Kotoko S.C. and their city rivals Accra Great Olympics FC.

Current squad

First team squad 

 Reference as of 12 March 2021

Out on loan

Honours

Official trophies (recognised by CAF and FIFA)

Domestic
Ghana Premier League
Champions (21): 1956, 1958, 1961–62, 1971, 1973, 1976, 1978, 1979, 1984, 1985, 1989–90, 1996–97, 1997–98, 1999, 2000, 2001, 2002, 2004–05, 2006–07, 2008–09, 2020–21
Ghanaian FA Cup
Winners (12): 1973, 1974, 1979, 1981, 1989, 1990 (After winning a protest that declared them winners), 1993–94, 1995–96, 1999, 2000, 2021, 2022 (record)
Ghana Super Cup
Winners (3): 1997, 1998, 2021 (joint record)

International
CAF Champions League
Winners (1): 2000
Runners-up (2): 1977, 1979
CAF Confederation Cup
Winners (1): 2004
CAF Super Cup:
Winners (1): 2001
Runners-up (1): 2005

Other GFA National Titles
 Ghana SWAG Cup: 7
 1973, 1974 (shared), 1977 (shared), 1978, 1979, 1984, 1985  Ghana Telecom Gala: 4
 GHALCA Special Cup: 3
 Ghana Top Four Cup: 3
 Ghana Top Eight Cup: 2
 President's Cup: 6
2003, 2009, 2013, 2015, 2022, 2023
 Independence Cup: 4
 PLB Special Knockout: 1
 June 4 Cup: 3
 31 December Revolution Cup: 1

Gold Coast
Inclusive of trophies won in the Accra Football League (Guggisberg Shield) and the Gold Coast Club Competition, both played during the colonial periodChampions (8):' 1920, 1922, 1925, 1927, 1929, 1933, 1935, 1953–54

Notable playersFor all former players with a Wikipedia article see :Category:Accra Hearts of Oak S.C. players Club captains 

 Mahatma Ottoo (2011–2013)
 Thomas Abbey (–2017)
 Inusah Musah (2018)
 Fatawu Mohammed (2018–present)

ManagersList of managers since 1991''
 Petre Gavrilă (1991–95)
 Cecil Jones Attuquayefio (1998–01)
 Herbert Addo (2002–03)
 Ernst Middendorp (2004)
 Cecil Jones Attuquayefio (2004)
 Archibald Lamptey (2004–05)
 Emmanuel Ofei Ansah (2005)
 Eyal Lahman (2008)
 Kosta Papić (2008–09)
 Nebojša Vučićević (2011–12)
 Charles Akonnor (2012)
 David Duncan (2012–13)
 Mohammed Ahmed (Polo) (Interim) (2014)
 Herbert Addo  (2014–2015)
Kenichi Yatsuhashi (2015–2016)
Sérgio Traguil (2016 –2016)
 Frank Nuttall (2017–18)
 Henry Wellington Lamptey (2018)
 Seth Hoffmann (2018)
 Kim Grant (2018–2019)
 Edward Nii Odoom (2020)
 Kosta Papić (2020–2021)
 Samuel Nii Noi (Interim) (2021)
 Samuel Boadu (2021–2022)
 Slavko Matic (2022–)

Seasons 
2020–21 Accra Hearts of Oak S.C. season

References

External links

 

 
Association football clubs established in 1911
Football clubs in Ghana
Hearts of Oak
1911 establishments in Gold Coast (British colony)
Sports clubs in Ghana
H
H
H